StAR-related lipid transfer domain protein 7 (STARD7) or gestational trophoblastic tumor gene-1 (GTT1) is a lipid transporter that specifically binds and transports phosphatidylcholine between membranes.

Function and tissue distribution 
StarD7 is found in the cytosol and associated with the mitochondrion.  When overproduced in the cell, mitochondrial levels of phosphatidylcholine rise.  High levels of the protein are found in tumor cells compared to normal cells, suggesting a role in cell proliferation.

Structure
There are two forms of StarD7: StarD7-I and StarD7-II.  The former is 295 amino acids long.  StarD7-I possesses an additional 75 amino acids at its amino-terminus, which form a signaling sequence that targets it to the outer membrane of the mitochondrion.

StarD7 contains a StAR-related transfer domain (START), from which it derives its name.  Moreover, the protein is a member of the predominantly phosphatidylcholine transporter subfamily of START proteins, the StarD2 subfamily.  It shares 25% sequence identity with StarD2.

References 

Genes on human chromosome 2
Water-soluble transporters